James Bradley (born May 4, 1954) is an American author from Antigo, Wisconsin, specializing in historical nonfiction chronicling the Pacific theatre of World War II. His father, John Bradley, was long thought to be one of the six men who was in the photograph raising the American flag on Mount Suribachi during the Battle of Iwo Jima in 1945. That photograph has gone on to be one of the most duplicated and reproduced photos ever taken.

On June 23, 2016, the Marine Corps announced after an investigation, that John Bradley was not in Rosenthal's photograph of six Marines raising the second (and larger) flag on Mount Suribachi on February 23, 1945, although he had been involved in the first raising of a smaller flag two hours earlier, and was still on the mountaintop during the second flag raising.

Biography
 
In 2000, Bradley published Flags of Our Fathers, written with the author Ron Powers, which tells the story of five US Marines and a US Navy corpsman attached to the Marines Corps (his father, John Bradley, who did not raise the second, larger flag), raising the American flag during the Battle of Iwo Jima and the Seventh War Loan Drive after the battle. In that book, which spent 46 weeks on the New York Times bestseller list and was made into a film directed by Clint Eastwood, Bradley took great care to locate and speak with family and friends who actually knew the men depicted. In doing so, he received praise for his realistic portrayals and bringing the men involved to life.

The book and the film are in-depth looks at those involved and their war-time service. Of the six men who raised the second and larger replacement flag on Mount Suribachi on February 23, 1945, PhM2c. John Bradley, although he had been involved in only the first raising of a smaller flag hours before, was not involved in the second flag raising, Pfc. Ira Hayes, and Pfc. Rene Gagnon were the only survivors of the battle. Sgt. Michael Strank, Cpl. Harlon Block, and Pfc. Franklin Sousley were killed in action later on in the battle. The book and film tell the story in a before, during, and after format, and both were well received upon their release. An impromptu speech Bradley, who did not raise the flag, gave at the Marine Corps War Memorial (sometimes called the Iwo Jima memorial) was transcribed by Michael T. Powers in October 2000, and widely circulated on the Internet. On June 23, 2016, the United States Marine Corps identified Cpl. Harold Schultz as the sixth flag raiser for the second flag.

In 2003, Bradley published Flyboys: A True Story of Courage. That book tells the story of an air raid that took place during the Battle of Iwo Jima, some 150 miles away, when United States warplanes bombed the small communications outpost on Chichi Jima. While Iwo Jima had Japanese forces numbering 22,000, Chichi Jima's forces numbered 25,000. Nine American crewmen survived after being shot down in the raid. One was picked up by the American submarine USS Finback. That was Lieutenant George H. W. Bush, who later went on to become the 41st President of the United States. The other eight were captured as POWs by the Japanese and were executed and eaten, a fact that remained hidden until much later. Like Flags of Our Fathers, Flyboys: A True Story of Courage also topped the New York Times Bestseller list when it came out.

In 2009, he published his third New York Times best selling book, The Imperial Cruise. It concerns the 1905 diplomatic mission led by then-Secretary of War William Howard Taft and Alice Roosevelt, as well as the larger implications of President Theodore Roosevelt's foreign policy, particularly with regard to Japan.  The New York Times published a complimentary review, writing that "The Imperial Cruise is startling enough to reshape conventional wisdom about Roosevelt's presidency." The book exposes the blatantly racist and exploitative policy of the United States in its attempt to extend its influence into the Pacific rim, acquiring Hawaii by conquest and the Philippines by purchase from the Spanish after ostensibly having entered the conflict to aid the Filipino freedom fighters. The American occupation was marked by torture and repression of the very people they had come to help.

The China Mirage: The Hidden History of American Disaster in Asia is James' fourth book, detailing America's involvement in China since the early 19th Century during the heights of opium trade, through the conclusion of the Second World War and Mao Zedong's rise to power. The premise of the book is how the United States failed to understand Asian cultures that led to poor decision-making by policy makers in the US State Department as well as by both President Theodore Roosevelt and Franklin Roosevelt.  Ultimately, Bradley makes the suggestion that the War in the Pacific, the Korean War and the Vietnam War would have been avoided had President Franklin Roosevelt not been unduly influenced by the China Lobby that supported Chiang Kai-shek.

Portrayal in film 
James Bradley's father, John Bradley, is featured incorrectly as a flag raiser of the second flag in the 2006 Clint Eastwood movie Flags of Our Fathers, which was made a decade before new evidence showed he was not one of them. The movie is based on James Bradley's book of the same title.

Works
 Flags of Our Fathers (with Ron Powers). New York: Bantam, 2000.   
 Flyboys: A True Story of Courage  Boston: Little, Brown & Co., 2003.   
 The Imperial Cruise: The Secret History of Empire and War  Boston: Little, Brown & Co., 2009.   
 The China Mirage: The Hidden History of American Disaster in Asia Boston: Little, Brown & Co., 2015.

References

External links 

 Lecture on The Imperial Cruise at the Pritzker Military Museum & Library
 Participant in Panel Discussion, Turning Point: 36 Days on Iwo Jima 1945 at the Pritzker Military Museum & Library

1954 births
Living people
Historians of World War II
Place of birth missing (living people)
20th-century American historians
20th-century American male writers
21st-century American historians
21st-century American male writers
People from Antigo, Wisconsin
American male non-fiction writers
Historians from Wisconsin